Joseph Charles Hoare (15 November 1851 – 18 September 1906) was the Anglican Bishop of Victoria, Hong Kong from 1898 to 1906.

Life and ministry
Hoare was born in Ramsgate on 15 November 1851. His father was the Revd Edward Hoare, an honorary canon of Canterbury Cathedral. 
He was educated at Tonbridge School and Trinity College, Cambridge.

Hoare was ordained in 1875 and was a curate at Holy Trinity Church in Tunbridge Wells. After this he was principal of the Church Missionary Society (CMS)  training college in Ningbo from 1878 to 1898.

Hoare married his first cousin, Alice Julian Patteson on 14 December 1882 at Thorpe-next-Norwich.  Alice died in 1883.

Hoare's last post was as Bishop of Victoria, Hong Kong and the Warden of St. Paul's College, Hong Kong, to which he was appointed in 1898. He was consecrated a bishop on the Feast of St Barnabas 1898 (11 June), at St Paul's Cathedral by Frederick Temple, Archbishop of Canterbury.

Trinity College, Cambridge, honoured him with the Doctor of Divinity (DD) degree on 18 January 1900.

On 18 September 1906, Hoare and four St Paul's College students were drowned amidst a typhoon during a preaching journey in Castle Peak, Tuen Mun.

References

Sources

1858 births
1906 deaths
People educated at Tonbridge School
Alumni of Trinity College, Cambridge
Anglican bishops of Victoria, Hong Kong
19th-century Anglican bishops in China
20th-century Anglican bishops in China
Canons of Canterbury
Principals of St. Paul's College, Hong Kong
Deaths in tropical cyclones